Vasconcellea horovitziana is a species of plant in the family Caricaceae. It is endemic to Ecuador.  Its natural habitat is subtropical or tropical moist lowland forest. It is threatened by habitat loss.

It was formerly placed in genus Carica.

References

horovitziana
Endemic flora of Ecuador
Endangered plants
Taxonomy articles created by Polbot